Henry Griffiths (29 November 1875–1950) was an English footballer who played in the Football League for Burton Swifts and Nottingham Forest.

References

1875 births
1950 deaths
English footballers
Association football forwards
English Football League players
Burton Swifts F.C. players
Bristol Rovers F.C. players
Reading F.C. players
Nottingham Forest F.C. players
Millwall F.C. players
Kidderminster Harriers F.C. players